Ippolito Fiorini (c. 1549–1621) was a composer and lutenist, and the maestro di capella at the court of Alfonso II d'Este in Ferrara during its entire existence (1568–1597). As maestro di capella his role was largely an administrative one, however in addition to being involved with the music of the chapel he also was involved with the concerto delle donne. He also played the archlute. He wrote music for the duchesses' balletti to the text of Giovanni Battista Guarini, although none is extant, and probably also wrote for the concerto delle donne. He was in charge of the Accademia della Morte in Ferrara from 1594 to 1597.

Notes

References
Iain Fenlon. "Ippolito Fiorini," Grove Music Online, ed. L. Macy (accessed May 20, 2006), grovemusic.com  (subscription access).

1540s births
1621 deaths
Italian male classical composers
Italian Baroque composers
Renaissance composers
17th-century Italian composers
17th-century male musicians